Xuancheng is a city in the southeast of Anhui province. Archeological digs suggest that the city has been settled for over 4,000 years, and has been under formal administration since the Qin dynasty. Located in the lower Yangtze River drainage basin and Yangtze River Delta, it borders Wuhu to the northwest, Chizhou to the west, Huangshan to the southwest, and the provinces of Zhejiang and Jiangsu to the southeast and northeast respectively.

History

Archeological digs in Xuancheng have found pottery and stoneware indicative of the Liangzhu Culture.

During the Spring and Autumn period, the area belonged to the State of Wu, although, upon the decline of Wu, the area was also ruled by the State of Chu and the State of Yue.

During the Danyang Commandery, Wanling (presently Xuanzhou District, the site of the Xuancheng Municipal Government) served as the administrative center. Xuanzhou has been the political, economic and cultural center of administration since then. In 281 CE,  was established.

Xuancheng became a prefecture-level city in 2000.

Geography and Climate

Its terrain is varied and complicated, basically sloping downward from the south to the north. Its landform can be approximately divided into five types: mountain, hill, valley and basin, hillock and plain. The south and southeast regions belong to ranges of Tianmu Mountain, while the southwest and west regions are respectively parts of ranges of Mt. Huangshan and Mt. Jiuhua.  is also located within Xuancheng. 59.34% of the city's area is forested.

The city has a subtropical humid monsoon climate, with four distinct seasons and abundant precipitation. Of the four seasons, summer is the longest. Its annual average temperature falls round 15.6C (60.1F). Most of the rainfall occurs in summer. The plum rain season lasts from mid-June to early July.

Administration

Xuancheng City administers seven county-level divisions, including one district, two county-level cities and five counties.

Xuanzhou District
Ningguo City
Guangde City
Langxi County
Jing County
Jixi County
Jingde County

These are further divided into 115 township-level divisions, including 61 towns, 44 townships and ten subdistricts.

Language and culture

In Xuancheng, Jianghuai Mandarin and Wu Chinese are spoken as well as Standard Mandarin.

Xuancheng is a city with 2,000 years of history and cultural relics. It has a profound cultural heritage and rich tourism resources. There are many scenery resorts, such as the country's largest captive breeding bases—Chinese Crocodile Lake, one of the four unique scenes – Taiji Cave, Peach Blossom Pool, Jing Ting Mountain, Zhangshan Canyon, and cultural sites of the New Fourth Army, the Ancestral Hall of the Hu Family in Jixi, the former residence of Mr. Hu Shih, the Jiang's Village in Jingde, and so on. Since reform and opening up, the city has achieved a lot of progress, and is accelerating the development of municipal services, transport, tourism and other infrastructural facilities. Xuancheng, as a new city with pleasant environments of living, enterprising, sightseeing, is on the rise. The Ningguo Stadium is located in the city. The 12,000-capacity stadium is used mainly for association football matches.

Demographics 

Its population was 2,500,063 as of 2020 census whom 774,332 lived in the built-up (or metro) area made of Xuanzhou District.

The city is home to 45 ethnic minorities, whose population totals about 13,000 people. Xuancheng administers one ethnic township: .

Economy
As of 2020, the city's gross domestic product is estimated at ¥160.75 billion, its inflation rate was 2.4%, and its urban unemployment rate was 2.7%. Total consumer retail sales in 2020 reached ¥62.66 billion, and foreign trade totaled ¥13.44 billion.

Xuancheng's per capita disposable income is ¥30,746 as of 2020, and stood at ¥42,134 for urban residents, and ¥18,928 for rural residents.

Xuancheng's major industrial products include beverages, cloth, concrete, electronics components, fertilizer, paper and cardboard.

Xuancheng is known for its production of high quality Xuan paper, Xuan writing brushes, and Xuan ink stones, all of which are used in traditional Chinese calligraphy and painting. These products make up a large proportion of the city's exports.

Notable people

 Hu Shih (1891–1962): philosopher, essayist and diplomat, one of the leaders of China's New Culture Movement, former president of Peking University (in 1939 Hu Shih was nominated for a Nobel Prize in literature)
 Wang Jiaxiang (1906–1974): the first Chinese Ambassador to Soviet Union after the establishment of People's Republic of China
 Wu Zuoren (1908–1997): painter, former principal of the China Central Academy of Fine Arts
 Ren Xinmin (1915–2017): aerospace engineer and a specialist in astronautics and liquid rocket engine technology
 Jiang Zemin (1926– ): former General Secretary of the Communist Party and President of China
 Hu Jintao (1942– ): former General Secretary of the Communist Party and President of China
 Mei Yaochen (1002–60), a major poet of the Northern Song Dynasty

Education

 Hefei University of Technology Xuancheng Campus
 Xuancheng High School
 XuanCheng Vocational & Technical college

Transportation

Rail
Xuancheng is served by the Anhui–Jiangxi Railway and Beijing–Taipei High-Speed Rail Corridor.

References

External links
 Xuancheng Government website (in Simplified Chinese)

 
Cities in Anhui